The Rock 'n' Roll San Diego Marathon is an annual marathon foot-race held in San Diego, California.  Established in 1998, it is the original race in the Rock 'n' Roll Marathon Series.  The event includes a half marathon.

History 

It was established in 1998.

The 2006 marathon had 21,159 participants—17,339 of whom successfully finished the race.

In 2013, Bernard Koech set the half marathon course record of 58:41.  This was the fourth-fastest time ever for the event at the time, although the time did not meet official IAAF requirements as the course contained an excessive downhill.

The 2020 edition of the race was cancelled due to the coronavirus pandemic.

Course 

The marathon originally commenced at 6th Avenue at Palm and concluded on Broadway Avenue downtown San Diego. The following year, the finish moved to the Naval Training Center, and three years later moved to the Parade Deck in Marine Corps Recruit Depot. In 2010 a new course was defined which ended at SeaWorld San Diego.  In 2013, the course was again re-routed with a new finish line at Petco Park.  There is also a half-marathon over portions of the same course and a four-person relay option.

Runners have seven hours in which to complete the marathon.  The four-person relay option has a four-hour time limit.

Foundation controversy
Since its inception, the marathon claims to have raised in excess of $100 million for charities.

In 2008 the Competitor Group took over Elite Racing, the company that had been organizing the Rock 'n' Roll Marathon. The following year, 2009, an internal audit revealed that the charity in whose name the race had been run, Elite Racing Foundation for Children, Education & Medical Research, had been improperly commingling funds with the for-profit Elite Racing. It further found that the foundation was being operated "in many instances for the benefit of the for-profit," and that the charity's role in hosting the races had been overstated. As a result, the race had benefited improperly from hundreds of thousands of dollars in public subsidies and grants. In announcing the results of the audit, Competitor said it would return $190,500 to San Diego County and $152,544 to the city of San Diego, spend the remaining foundation funds on health and wellness causes, file amended tax returns, and dissolve the foundation. Competitor Group made the final payments in October 2009. Altogether the company returned $344,176 to the city and county.

Records
In 2015, Harriette Thompson of Charlotte, North Carolina, completed the Rock 'n' Roll San Diego Marathon at the age of 92 years, 65 days, thus becoming the oldest woman to complete a marathon. In 2017, at the same event, she became the oldest woman to finish a half marathon, at age 94.

Winners

Marathon 

Key: Course record (in bold)

Half marathon

Notes

References

External links

San Diego Rock 'n' Roll Marathon & Half Marathon
Marathon Info

Recurring events established in 1998
Marathons in the United States
Sports in San Diego
Foot races in California
Dalian Wanda Group